WJPS (107.1 FM) is an American radio station broadcasting a classic hits format. Licensed to Boonville, Indiana, United States, the station serves the Evansville area. The station is currently owned by Mark and Saundra Lange, through licensee The Original Company, Inc., and features programming from ABC Radio.

History
The station went on the air as WBNL-FM on March 22, 1979. On May 15, 2001, the station changed its call sign to WYXY; on November 11, 2005, it changed to WEJK, and on October 9, 2014, it changed to the current WJPS.

From the late 90s to the fall of 2003, the station was known as "Y 107 - Classic Hits." In November 2003, South Central Communications, the station operator switched WYXY to Christmas music. On December 26, 2003, the station became "107.1 WYXY - Today's Christian Music." This was the Salem Radio Network's format that was based out of Nashville, Tennessee, and broadcast on the FISH stations across the country. On October 7, 2005, at 12:00 PM, the station left the Contemporary Christian format and became "107.1 JACK-FM." JACK is the format that originated in Canada in 2002. It plays a shuffle of music from the 70s, 80s, 90s, and a few of today's hits.

It was announced on August 18, 2014, that South Central Communications would be turning the operations of WEJK over to Vincennes-based The Original Company. Once approved by the FCC, The Original Company would take over the operations of WEJK and will operate the station via a time brokerage agreement. Also, when the changing of licenses was finalized, WEJK would become a sister station to WYFX in nearby Mount Vernon, Indiana. The changeover was set to be completed on September 1, at which time 107.1 flipped back to classic hits as Classic Hits 107.1. Upon acquiring WEJK's license outright on October 9, 2014, at a price of $350,000, The Original Company changed the station's call letters to WJPS.

History of call letters
The call letters WJPS were previously assigned to an AM station in Evansville. An ABC affiliate, it began broadcasting October 30, 1948, on 1330 kHz with power of 5 KW (daytime) and 1 KW (night). It was considered one of the finest "Top 40" small-market stations in the nation during the 1960s and 1970s.

References

External links

JPS
Classic hits radio stations in the United States
Radio stations established in 1979
1979 establishments in Indiana